Prince Amedeo, 3rd Duke of Aosta (Amedeo Umberto Isabella Luigi Filippo Maria Giuseppe Giovanni di Savoia-Aosta; 21 October 1898 – 3 March 1942) was the third Duke of Aosta and a first cousin, once removed of the King of Italy, Victor Emmanuel III. During World War II, he was the Italian Viceroy of Italian East Africa (Africa Orientale Italiana, or AOI).

Biography
Amedeo was born in Turin, Piedmont, to Prince Emanuele Filiberto, 2nd Duke of Aosta (son of Amadeo I of Spain and Princess Maria Vittoria), and Princess Hélène (daughter of Prince Philippe of Orléans and Princess Marie Isabelle of Orléans). As his patrilinal great-grandfather was King Victor Emmanuel II of Italy, he was a member of the House of Savoy. He was known from birth by the courtesy title of Duke of Apulia.

Amedeo was a very tall man (in stark contrast of the King who was known to be quite short). According to Amedeo Guillet, he was once referred to by a journalist as "Your Highness" (which in Italian could also be interpreted to mean "your height"). The Duke replied in jest: "198 centimetres" (6 feet, 6 inches).

Education and early military career

 

Amedeo was educated at St David's College, Reigate, Surrey, in England. He cultivated British mannerisms, spoke Oxford English, and even enjoyed the pastimes of fox hunting and polo. Amedeo entered the Nunziatella, the military academy in Naples, joined the Italian Royal Army (Regio Esercito) and fought with distinction in the artillery during World War I. He left the army in 1921 and traveled widely in Africa.

Amedeo subsequently rejoined the Italian armed forces and became a pilot. In 1932, he joined the Italian Royal Air Force (Regia Aeronautica). Amedeo served under Marshall Rodolfo Graziani and Libyan Governor Pietro Badoglio during later stages of the so-called "pacification of Libya" (1911 to 1932). Amedeo and his fellow airmen harried the Senussi forces of Omar Mukhtar from the sky.  When hostilities in Libya came to an end in early 1932, much was made of the participation of the "Duke of Apulia" as the commander of the airmen who forced the Senussi to flee Libya and seek relief in Egypt. Amedeo, portrayed by the tall actor Sky du Mont, appears in several non-flying scenes with Graziani in the movie The Lion of the Desert, about the Italian conquest of Libya.

On 4 July 1931, upon the death of his father, Amedeo became the Duke of Aosta.

Viceroy and governor-general
In 1937, after the Italian conquest of Ethiopia during the Second Italo-Abyssinian War, the Duke of Aosta replaced Marshal Graziani as Viceroy and as Governor-General of Italian East Africa. It was generally conceded that he was a vast improvement over Graziani. As Viceroy and Governor-General, the Duke of Aosta was also the Commander-in-Chief of all Italian military forces in Eritrea, Ethiopia, and Somaliland.

World War II

When Italy declared war on the United Kingdom and France on 10 June 1940, the Duke of Aosta became the commander of the Italian forces in what is known as the East African Campaign of World War II. He oversaw the initial Italian advances into the Sudan and Kenya and, in August, he oversaw the Italian invasion of British Somaliland.

In January 1941, the British launched a counter-invasion and the Italians went on the defensive in East Africa. The Italians fought throughout February. But, after fierce resistance, the Battle of Keren ended in Italian defeat, after which the rest of Eritrea, including the port of Massawa, fell quickly. On 31 January, the Duke of Aosta reported that the Italian military forces in East Africa were down to 67 operational aircraft with limited fuel stocks. With supplies running low and with no chance of re-supply, the Duke of Aosta opted to concentrate the remaining Italian forces into several strongholds: Gondar, Amba Alagi, Dessie, and Gimma. He himself commanded the 7,000 Italians at the mountain fortress of Amba Alagi. With his water supply compromised, surrounded, and besieged by 9,000 British and Commonwealth troops and more than 20,000 Ethiopian irregulars, the Duke of Aosta surrendered Amba Alagi on 18 May 1941. Due to the gallant resistance of the Italian garrison, the British allowed them to surrender with honours of war.

Death
Shortly after his surrender, the Duke of Aosta was interned in a prisoner-of-war camp in Nairobi, Kenya. He was placed in command of his fellow prisoners, but never saw the end of World War II. On 3 March 1942, shortly after his internment, he died at the prison camp, reportedly as a result of complications from both tuberculosis and malaria. Amedeo was succeeded by his brother, Aimone, 4th Duke of Aosta. From 18 May 1941, the same day Amedeo surrendered Amba Alagi, Aimone was proclaimed King of Croatia under the regal name Tomislav II.

Aftermath
Amedeo was well known and highly regarded for being a gentleman. In one instance, before he fled his headquarters at Addis Ababa, he wrote a note to the British to thank them in advance for protecting the women and children in the cities.

Count Galeazzo Ciano, Italian Foreign Minister under his father-in-law Italian dictator Benito Mussolini, paid Amedeo a high compliment in his famous diaries. Upon being given the news of the Duke's death Ciano wrote, "So dies the image of a Prince and an Italian. Simple in his ways, broad in outlook, and humane in spirit."

Emperor Haile Selassie of Ethiopia was also impressed by the respect and care that the Duke of Aosta showed to the exiled Emperor's personal property left behind in Addis Ababa. In a gesture of thanks, the Emperor during his state visit to Italy in 1953 invited the widowed Duchess of Aosta to tea during his stay in Milan, but was then informed by the Italian government that receiving the Duchess would cause offense to the Italian Republic, and so the Emperor sadly canceled the visit. Instead he invited the 5th Duke of Aosta to Ethiopia in the mid-60s, and accorded him all the protocol due to visiting royalty.

Family
Amedeo was married 5 November 1927, in Naples, to his first cousin Princess Anne of Orléans (1906–1986), daughter of Prince Jean, Duke of Guise, and his wife, Princess Isabelle of Orléans.

They had two daughters:

 Princess Margherita of Savoy-Aosta (7 April 1930 Capodimonte Palace - 10 January 2022); married Robert, Archduke of Austria-Este (son of the last Austrian emperor, Charles I) on 28 December 1953. They had five children.
 Princess Maria Cristina of Savoy-Aosta (12 September 1933 at Miramare Castle); married Prince Casimir of Bourbon-Two Sicilies, son of Prince Gabriel of Bourbon-Two Sicilies and his second wife, Princess Cecylia Lubomirska, on 29 January 1967. They had four children.

Cultural depictions

Prince Amedeo's time in Italian Cyrenaica was depicted in the 1981 film Lion of the Desert; Amedeo was played by Sky du Mont.

Amedeo was also briefly mentioned in "A Farewell to Arms" by Ernest Hemingway.

In the game, Hearts Of Iron 4, he is the leader of Italian East Africa

See also
Kingdom of Italy (1861–1946)
History of Libya as Italian Colony
Colonial heads of Italian East Africa
East African Campaign (World War II)

Ancestry

References

External links
 

Amedeo, 3rd Duke Of Aosta
Italian military personnel of World War II
Italian prisoners of war in World War II
World War II prisoners of war held by the United Kingdom
1898 births
1942 deaths
Italian East Africa
People of former Italian colonies
East African campaign (World War II)
20th-century deaths from tuberculosis
Deaths from malaria
Italian people who died in prison custody
Infectious disease deaths in Kenya
Prisoners who died in British military detention
Nobility from Turin
Amedeo, 3rd Duke Of Aosta
Amedeo, 3rd Duke Of Aosta
Italian generals
Italian military personnel killed in World War II
Tuberculosis deaths in Kenya
Military personnel from Turin